Ahmed Omar is a Qatari-Lebanese football coach and former striker who played for Al Sadd. He is currently an AFC Elite Coaching Instructor and regularly heads training sessions for young coaches in Asia. He was the first person in the history of the Emir Cup to win the title as both coach and player.

He retired from playing after Al Sadd lost the 1983 Emir Cup final to Al Arabi. Geraldão scored the only goal of the match in the 80th minute from a direct free kick. After the match, there was a mass brawl between the two teams, and the field was described as a 'boxing ring'. The referee of the match, Mustafa Ezzat, decided to retire afterwards. Although Al Sadd won the league that season, Omar felt that it did not make up for losing in the Emir Cup or the ill-natured events which occurred after the loss. He went on to coach Al Sadd, first in 1987–88, winning the Emir Cup that year, and again in 1993–94, when he also won the Emir Cup. He coached Al Sadd for a third interval, from 1996 to 1997.

References

Qatar international footballers
Qatari footballers
Qatari football managers
Living people
Al Sadd SC players
Al Sadd SC managers
Lebanese footballers
Lebanese football managers
Qatari people of Lebanese descent
Sportspeople of Lebanese descent
 
Association football forwards
Year of birth missing (living people)